The 2021 All-Pro teams were named by the Associated Press (AP), Pro Football Writers of America (PFWA), and Sporting News (SN) for performance in the 2021 NFL season. Any player selected to the first-team of any of the teams can be described as an "All-Pro." The AP team, with first-team and second-team selections, was chosen by a national panel of fifty NFL writers and broadcasters. The Sporting News All-NFL team was voted on by NFL players and executives. The PFWA team is selected by its more than 300 national members who are accredited media members covering the NFL.

Teams 

AP source:
PFWA source:
SN source:

Five players were unanimous selections via the AP ballot, including RB Jonathan Taylor (Indianapolis), WRs Davante Adams (Green Bay) and Cooper Kupp (Los Angeles Rams), EDGE T. J. Watt (Pittsburgh), and IDL Aaron Donald (Los Angeles Rams).

Key
AP = Associated Press first-team All-Pro
AP-2 = Associated Press second-team All-Pro
AP-2t = Tied for second-team All-Pro in the AP vote
PFWA = Pro Football Writers Association All-NFL
SN = Sporting News All-Pro

Position differences

PFWA and SN do not separate the tackles and guards into more specific positions as the AP does. Additionally, PWFA and SN formally select defensive ends as opposed to edge rushers, while PFWA selects outside linebackers separately from middle linebackers.

References 

All-Pro Teams
Allpro